Virani is a surname. Notable people with the surname include:

Arif Virani (born 1971), Canadian lawyer and politician
Barkat Virani, Gujarati author and poet
Kaul Virani, Indian politician
Pinki Virani (born 1959), Indian writer, journalist, and human rights activist
Shafique Virani, Canadian scholar